Henri Konan "Zabla" (1937 – 28 March 2009) is a former Ivory Coast international football central defender who played for Stade d'Abidjan.

Club career
Konan played club football for Stade d'Abidjan during the 1960s and helped the club win the 1966 African Cup of Champions Clubs, its first continental title.

He was one of the Ivorian footballer honored by the Confederation of African Football at its 50th anniversary in 2009.

International career
Konan made several appearances for the Ivory Coast national football team, and he played for Ivory Coast at the 1965 and 1968 African Cup of Nations finals, where he would score a goal in the semi-final.

Personal
Konan died at age 72 in March 2009.

References

1937 births
2009 deaths
Ivorian footballers
Ivory Coast international footballers
1965 African Cup of Nations players
1968 African Cup of Nations players
Stade d'Abidjan players
Association football defenders